Cotesia marginiventris is a species of parasitoid wasp that develops in Noctuidae caterpillars. It can be found in the Americas. The wasp finds caterpillar hosts to rear its young in by detecting the volatiles produced by the plants that the herbivorous caterpillars feed on.

References

Microgastrinae
Biological pest control wasps
Hymenoptera of North America
Hymenoptera of South America
Insects described in 1865